The Japan women's national rugby sevens team has competed in competitions such as the Hong Kong Women's Sevens.

In 2012-13 they played two World Series tournaments, resulting 13th in China. In the 2013–14  season they resulted 7th at São Paulo and 8th at Atlanta. They were not invited to any World Series tournament in 2014–15. Japan played the full 2015–16 World Series, with a best result of 9th at the Dubai Sevens, and finished 11th in the overall standings.

Japan qualified for the 2016 Summer Olympics after winning the 2015 ARFU Women's Sevens Championships. The team won over Kenya but lost twice to Brazil, finishing 10th in the tournament. In 2021, the Sakura's lost all of their five games and finished last at the 2020 Olympics.

Tournament history
A red box around the year indicates tournaments played within the Japan

Women's Sevens Series
Japan qualified for the 2017-18 World Rugby Women's Sevens by defeating South Africa in the finals of the 2017 Hong Kong Women's Sevens.

Summer Olympics

Rugby World Cup Sevens

Players

Olympic squads

Japan's roster of 12 athletes to the 2020 Olympics was named on 19 June 2021.

Head coach: Hare Makiri

Wakaba Hara
Yume Hirano
Haruka Hirotsu
Marin Kajiki
Mifuyu Koide
Rinka Matsuda
Hana Nagata
Mei Otani
Raichel Bativakalolo (c)
Mayu Shimizu (c)
Miyu Shirako
Honoka Tsutsumi

See also

References

External links
Official website
WorldRugby profile

 
sevens
Women's national rugby sevens teams
World Rugby Women's Sevens Series core teams